= Republican calendar =

Republican calendar may refer to:

- French Republican calendar
- Roman Republican calendar
- Republic of China calendar
